Magdalena Kupiec (born 7 October 1976) is a Polish breaststroke swimmer. She competed in two events at the 1992 Summer Olympics.

References

External links
 

1976 births
Living people
Polish female breaststroke swimmers
Olympic swimmers of Poland
Swimmers at the 1992 Summer Olympics
Sportspeople from Bytom